Latimer was a station on the Port Authority of Allegheny County's light rail network, located in Bethel Park, Pennsylvania. The street level stop was designed as a small commuter stop, serving area residents who walked to the train so they could be taken toward Downtown Pittsburgh.

Latimer was one of eleven stops closed on June 25, 2012 as part of a system-wide consolidation effort.

References

External links 

Port Authority T Stations Listings

Former Port Authority of Allegheny County stations
Railway stations closed in 2012